The 1913 International Exposition  was a World's Fair held in Ghent from 26 April to 3 November.

History
A number of buildings were completed for the occasion. Notably, Gent-Sint-Pieters railway station was completed in 1912 in time for the exposition, and was situated opposite the new hotel, Flandria Palace. A park, Citadelpark, was redesigned for the fair. Various Belgian cities had a pavilion and an artificial town, called "Oud Vlaenderen" (Old Flanders) was created.

The four sons of Aymon statue, depicting Reinout, Adelaert, Ritsaert and Writsaert on their horse, Beyaert, was erected on the central approach avenue to the exposition.

In preparation for the exhibition, renovations were made in the centre of Ghent, including a large number of houses on the Graslei. Some years beforen the neo-gothic St Michael's Bridge had been built to provide visitors to the exhibition with a vantage point to view the town, the post office and the Korenmarkt (Wheat Market) had been built, and the carved heads now arrayed around it represented the rulers who attended the exhibition (including Florence Nightingale). The construction of the exhibition was controversial and ended on the eve of World War I with serious debts.

During the fair, an international conference on urban planning was held, organised by Paul Saintenoy, Emile Vinck, and Paul Otlet.

Belgium's first aerial postage service was operated from 1 May to 25 August by Henri Crombez during the exposition.

Greek confectionery maker Leonidas Kestekides attended the fair, and then settled permanently in Belgium and founded the  Leonidas chocolate company.

In the last of such type of human zoo stagings, part of a group of 53 Igorot tribesmen from Bontoc, Mountain Province, 28-year-old Filipino Timicheg was "displayed" and died here of tuberculosis or flu. A tunnel in the Gent-Sint-Pieters railway station renovation project is named after him.

Participants
The participating nations included: Algeria, Austria, Canada, the Congo, Denmark, France, Germany, Italy, Japan, Morocco, the Netherlands, Persia, Russia, Spain, Switzerland, Tunisia and the United States

See also
Belgian general strike of 1913 (14-24 April 1913)

References

External links

Official website of the BIE
 Photograph of King Albert I, Queen Elisabeth and the Mayor of Ghent, Emile Braun (right), at the opening of the World's Fair in Ghent
www.expo1913.be
foto's op freewebs.com

World's fairs in Belgium
Culture of Ghent
1913 in Belgium
20th century in Ghent